The Art of Virtue is the second CD by Nashville, Tennessee-based singer/songwriter Adrienne Young and her band, Little Sadie.

Young, a history buff, was inspired by Benjamin Franklin’s "Thirteen Virtues," a copy of which was included with the CD, and distressed by the Republican Party’s efforts to leverage “moral virtues” during the 2004 presidential election.  The anthemic title track, composed with Will Kimbrough, served as a mission statement of sorts for Young, both personally and professionally, and Franklin's influence is apparent right from the opening lines: "Gonna start a revolution / made of action, not of words / Practicing the art of virtue / A Joyride on the learning curve."

Based in part on the positive response to her 2004 debut release, Plow to the End of the Row, Young was able to attract many of Nashville’s top session players including members of The Del McCoury Band to play on the CD.  The result was a noticeably more polished and professional sound that Young and her band, Little Sadie, would hone live in extensive touring throughout the latter half of the year.  With the new incarnation of Little Sadie (fiddler and banjoist Eric Merrill, guitarist Hans Holzen, bassist Kyle Kegerreis and percussionist Eric Platz), Young appeared at many major music festivals including the New Jersey Folk Festival, the Greyfox Bluegrass Festival, and the second annual Dead on the Creek Festival, held in Willits, California to honor Grateful Dead singer and guitarist Jerry Garcia.

Alongside the original songs and traditional tunes, The Art of Virtue featured a cover of the Grateful Dead's "Brokedown Palace".  Young's AddieBelle label struck a distribution deal with Ryko Records which insured that her music got placed in more record stores. Young used the release of the CD and subsequent concert tour to call attention to her involvement with the Food Routes Network, a non-profit organization that promotes sustainable agriculture and connects consumers with local farmers who are willing to sell direct.

The Art of Virtue placed third in Amazon.com's list of the best folk recordings of the year and was placed on numerous year-end best-of lists including the Americana Music Association, Boston Herald, Cape Cod Times, and Nashville Scene.  Appropriately, Young was invited to sing in Philadelphia on January 17, 2006, as part of Benjamin Franklin's 300th birthday celebration.

Track listing
"Art Of Virtue" (Adrienne Young / Will Kimbrough) – 3:06
"Bonaparte’s Retreat / My Love Is In America" (Traditional) – 2:21
"Hills & Hollers" (Adrienne Young / Mark D. Sanders) – 4:28
"Jump The Broom" (Adrienne Young / Will Kimbrough) – 3:37
"My Sin Is Pride" (Will Kimbrough / Tom Littlefield) – 2:50
"My Love Will Keep" (Adrienne Young / Mark D. Sanders) – 4:18
"Ella Arkansas" (Adrienne Young) – 5:36
"Rastus Russell" (Adrienne Young / Mark D. Sanders) – 4:12
"Wedding Ring" (Adrienne Young / Mark D. Sanders) – 3:16
"Don’t Get Weary" (Uncle Dave Macon) – 2:25
"Golden Ticket" (Eric Merrill) – 2:24
"Walls Of Jericho" (Adrienne Young) – 5:26
"It’s All The Same" (Adrienne Young / Will Kimbrough) – 4:48
"Farther Along / Bill In The Low Ground" (Traditional) – 4:09
"Brokedown Palace" (Jerry Garcia / Robert Hunter) – 5:22

Personnel
Adrienne Young - vocals, banjo, guitar
Will Kimbrough - guitar, vocals, banjo, resonator guitar
Alan Bartram – bass
David Briggs – organ
Mike Bub – bass
Clayton Campbell – fiddle
Jesse Cobb – mandolin
Flynn Cohen – guitar
John Deaderick – piano
Steve Ebe – drums
Chris Eldridge – guitar
Chris Fandolfee – banjo
Jeremy Garrett – fiddle, vocals
Tyler Grant – guitar
Meagan Gregory – fiddle
Andy Hall – dobro, vocals
Dave Jacques – bass
Derek Jones – bass
Fats Kaplan – pedal steel guitar, accordion
Rob McCoury – banjo
Eric Merrill – fiddle
Mark D. Sanders – vocals
Steven Sandifer – drums & percussion, vocals
Tim Stafford – guitar
Rob Trucks – vocals

References

Morris, Edward (2005) ‘’Adrienne Young Examines The Art of Virtue’’ CMT.com .
Naujeck, Jeanne Anne (2005) ‘’Renaissance Woman’’ The Tennessean, 26 June.

Adrienne Young albums
2005 albums